The Bloody Fists ,  is a 1971 Hong Kong action movie directed by See-Yuen Ng and starring Chen Siu Sing and Kuan Tai Chen. The memorable fight scenes were choreographed by Yuen Woo-ping, better known for choreographing Crouching Tiger, Hidden Dragon and The Matrix.

Synopsis
A roving band of Japanese karate fighters led by a masked, long-haired warrior (Kuan Tai Chen) enter a remote village in China hoping to get their hands on the local supply of "Dragon Herb." There they come into conflict with a group of Chinese kung fu fighters seeking to defend the herb. Tensions escalate, and the Chinese are defeated in several fights with the clearly superior Japanese force. Luckily, help arrives in the form of an outlaw kung fu expert (Chen Sing), who faces off against the Japanese leader in a climactic fight on the beach.

Background

Authors of The Encyclopedia of Martial Arts Movies said The Bloody Fists was See-Yuen Ng's "first directorial effort". They said, "Though the martial arts are rather primitive, its success as a low-budget independent production encouraged other directors to follow suit." Bey Logan, writing in Hong Kong Action Cinema, said The Bloody Fists was "widely distributed" and the director's "first hit". Richard Meyers, writing in Films of Fury: The Kung Fu Movie Book, said the film was an "independently produced milestone" for the director. The film was initially refused a BBFC certificate.

Kuan Tai Chen was a contract actor cast in the film by Shaw Brothers Studio, but the studio recalled him, resulting in numerous appearances of his character being played by another actor wearing a black mask to conceal his identity.

Reception

A film critic for Time Out called The Bloody Fists "a lively example" of an independent production "with a good portrait of collective villainy". The critic commended the "stylish visuals and the care taken to provide adequate motivation for the usual conflict of interests between the Chinese and the Japanese".

References

External links
 
 

Hong Kong martial arts films
1972 films
Kung fu films
1970s action films
1970s Mandarin-language films
1970s Hong Kong films